The 2021 Championships of the Small States of Europe was the third edition of the biennial competition Championships of the Small States of Europe organised by the Athletic Association of Small States of Europe (AASE). It was held on 5 June 2021 in Serravalle, San Marino. Originally scheduled for 2020, it was postponed to 2021 due to Covid-19.

Medal summary

Men

Women

Medal table

References

Results on World Athletics site
Results on Fidal site

External links
 (Archived)

Championships of the Small States of Europe
Small States of Europe
Championships of the Small States of Europe
Championships of the Small States of Europe